Madras Music Academy is one of the earliest established music academies in South India. Before the concept of infrastructure was introduced to India in the early 1920s, it was a gathering for elite musicians simply called (and is still more commonly referred to as) Music Academy It plays an important role in encouraging and promoting primarily the Carnatic Music Indian art form. It played a vital role in the revival of the Indian classical dance form of Bharatnatyam in the 1930s when it faced near extinction due to a negative connotation caused by conservative societal standards.

They also run a music school called the Teachers college of Carnatic Music which has many eminent musicians on its faculty. Musicians such as Tiger Varadachariar, Appa Iyer, Valadi Krishnaiyer and Mudicondan Venkatarama Iyer adorned the chair of Principal of the Teacher's College.

History
In 1927, the Indian National Congress held the All India Music Conference in Madras. At the end of the conference it was decided that an organisation be formed that helped the cause of music. The prime reason for this conference was E. Krishna Iyer who had played a vital role in reviving the south Indian dance art form—Bharatanatyam.

The academy was formally inaugurated on 18 August 1928 by C. P. Ramaswami Iyer, in the Y.M.I.A. Auditorium before a large and distinguished gathering.

Annual music conferences are held every December to collect all information regarding music, maintain the library and publish a journal. They also help to bring to public notice aspiring musicians and scholars by conducting competitions and other presentations.

For a decade, E. Krishna Iyer worked as the Secretary of the Madras Music Academy. The first Music Festival was held in December 1927 which is before the inauguration of the Music Academy. Since then, it had become a part of the Madras Music Academy's Activities to conduct several expositions and concerts on Carnatic Music every December. This later came to be popularly known as the Margazhi Season or is even referred to as the Music Season amongst Carnatic enthusiasts. This soon became the norm for all sabhas in Madras to conduct several concerts each day during the season. There were several sabhas before the formation of the Music Academy like the Parthasarathy Swami Sabha in Triplicane which was formed as early as 1900. However, it was the Madras Music Academy that set the trend of conducting the music festival during December.

Dr U. Rama Rao was the founder President of the academy and Basheer Ahmed Sayeed, the founder vice-president. The present President is N. Murali. The six past presidents are: Rama Rao, K. V. Krishnaswamy Iyer, T. L. Venkatarama Iyer, T. S. Rajam, K. R. Sundaram Iyer, and T. T. Vasu. Before the present building (T. T. Krishnamachari Auditorium) was constructed, the annual conferences and programmes were held in various locations around the city.

The building
During the first few years, the academy conducted its activities provisionally in George Town and later moved to Mylapore. In 1955, Pandit Jawaharlal Nehru laid the foundation stone for the music academy building that exists today on TTK Road in Mylapore. It was inaugurated on 20 December 1962 by Maharaja Jayachamaraja Wodeyar Bahadur, the then Governor of Madras.

There are two buildings for the Music Academy:

 The T.T. Krishnamachari Hall
 The Kasturi Srinivasan Hall

The T.T. Krishnamachari Hall is the first building that was built in 1955. It has a seating capacity of 1600.

The Kasturi Srinivasan Hall was built in 1982. It houses a small auditorium for conferences and concerts, a library, a committee room and a recording and demonstration room. It was here that T. N. Rajarathnam Pillai's tapes and audio CDs were produced.  Kasturi Srinivasan's nephew's son, N. Murali, the Joint Managing Director of The Hindu, is the current President of the academy.

Awards, recognition and contributions
Sangeetha Kalanidhi: The Music Academy, since 1929 has been recognising and rewarding people who contributed to the field of Carnatic music by honouring them with the title Sangeetha Kalanidhi. In 1968, M.S. Subbulakshmi was the first woman to receive the Sangeetha Kalanidhi award from Madras Music Academy. 
Sangeetha Kala Acharya: It was later in 1993 that the academy also started giving out the Sangeetha Kala Acharya title. It is awarded to 2 or 3 senior musicians every year.
Natya Kala Acharya: Since 2012, the academy has been recognising dancers with the Natya Kala Acharya title. A separate Dance conference is held in the first week of January. This award is now renamed as Nrithya Kalanidhi.
Vaggeyyakkara Award
Musicologist Award
Spirit of Youth-festival of Dance and Music: During the October of every year nearly 40 young artists are projected by the academy for their Classical Music and Dance talent.
Special TTK Award
Special Life Time Achievement award: This award has been conferred on only 3 people:
 Kamala Lakshminarayan 
 Lalgudi Jayaraman 
 TH Vinayakram
Best Artiste Award
Music Welfare
R.R.Talent Promotion Scheme: Two talented artists are selected by the academy and are sponsored for coaching under an eminent musician chosen by the academy. At the end of the training period the artists get to perform in the academy.
Teacher's College of Music is a school run by the academy for offering certified courses on Vocal, Violin and Mridangam.
Books: The academy conducts research on Music and publishes their findings. Some of the academy's publications:
The Ragas of Sangita Saramrta, a book written by King Tulaja I.
Lakshana Gitas
Raga Lakshanas

Library
Music Academy received a donation of Rs. 1,00,000 from S. Visvanathan in memory of K. R. Sundaram Iyer for the improvement of library activities. The library is now named as K. R. Sundaram Iyer Memorial Library. It has rare books, manuscripts and tape recordings of the proceedings of the Expert Committee sessions. The students of the Teacher's College of Music, members, music students and research scholars. Books on both music and other general subjects donated by the families of P. Sambamoorthy, Sangita Vidvan K. C. Thyagarajan, V. Raghavan, Venkatakrishnan, S. R. Janakiraman and other individuals.

See also

 Eastern fare music foundation
 Delhi University

References

External links
Music academy official website
Sabhas - Music Academy
The Music Academy
The Inauguration of the Music Academy building - Article from The Hindu

- Music Academy

Carnatic music
Culture of Chennai
Cultural centres in Chennai
Music venues in India
Music schools in India
1928 establishments in India
Arts organizations established in 1928
Music organisations based in India